The following is an episode list for the Disney animated television series DuckTales. The series is based on the Scrooge McDuck character and the Uncle Scrooge comic books created by Carl Barks. The series stars Scrooge, his great-nephews Huey, Dewey, and Louie and Webby Vanderquack, and several characters created for the series. While Huey, Dewey, and Louie originated in Donald Duck animated short subjects in the 1930s, their characterization on DuckTales approximated that of Barks' comics. Although Donald Duck was a major player in the Uncle Scrooge comics, he appeared as a guest star in a few DuckTales episodes.

The series aired in syndication. It premiered during the week of September 14–18, 1987 with an edited two-hour television movie version of the five-part serial "Treasure of the Golden Suns". (The airdate varied by market – WSYT aired it on September 18, while WSBK-TV aired it on September 20). Subsequently, on September 21, 1987, the series began airing in its regular time slot on weekdays. ("Treasure of the Golden Suns" first appeared in its serialized form from November 9–13, 1987). The first season, totaling 65 episodes, aired its finale, "Till Nephews Do Us Part", on January 1, 1988.

Ten episodes premiered during the second season, and 18 in the third. Three episodes produced for the third season were held back for broadcast until the fall of 1990, when the series was incorporated into The Disney Afternoon. Seven additional episodes were produced for its short final season, totaling 100 for the series. The show aired its final episode on November 28, 1990.

All 100 episodes from all 4 seasons are available on DVD in Region 1. The first twenty individual episodes of season one, numbered 6 to 25 in the list below, are also available on DVD in Region 2.

Series overview

Episodes

Season 1 (1987–1988)

Season 2 (1988–1989) 
In the wake of the first season and DuckTales first 65 episodes, Disney announced 30 additional episodes. However, during the second season, the only new DuckTales episodes to air were two television movie specials: "Time Is Money" in syndication (some stations airing it on November 24, others on December 9,) and "Super DuckTales" on NBC's The Magical World of Disney.  Like "Treasure of the Golden Suns" before them, "Time Is Money" and "Super DuckTales" premiered in the two-hour television movie format, but would repeat in the series' regular rotation as five-part serials. Specifically, "Time Is Money" was first serialized from February 20–24, 1989, and "Super DuckTales" was first serialized from October 9–13, 1989.

Season 3 (1989–1990) 
In September 1989, Chip 'n Dale Rescue Rangers joined DuckTales in syndication as a companion series. That fall, 17 of the 20 still-expected episodes first aired. Also, "A DuckTales Valentine" premiered in February 1990 on NBC's The Magical World of Disney.

DuckTales the Movie: Treasure of the Lost Lamp (1990) 

DuckTales the Movie: Treasure of the Lost Lamp is a feature film based on DuckTales. It was released by Walt Disney Pictures on August 3, 1990. It was produced by the Disney Television Animation studios, Walt Disney Animation France and DisneyToon Studios, and not by Walt Disney Feature Animation.

Season 4 (1990) 
On September 10, 1990, The Disney Afternoon started airing, with DuckTales included as part of its lineup and takes place after the events of DuckTales the Movie: Treasure of the Lost Lamp.  "Ducky Mountain High", "The Duck Who Knew Too Much", and "Scrooge's Last Adventure" were produced for season three, but did not air until season four.

Home media

NTSC
Walt Disney Studios Home Entertainment released four DVD volumes that collect the entire series in NTSC format. 99 out of 100 episodes are available for purchase on iTunes and Amazon as well (the episode "Sphinx For the Memories" is not available).

India (PAL)
In India where DuckTales was dubbed in Hindi for TV broadcast on Doordarshan and syndication on Star Plus, 60 episodes out of the first 70 episodes from Seasons 1 and 2 were released by Sony DADC India under license from Disney India, on 20 DVD volumes and Video CDs in PAL format.  These discs support Region 2, Region 4 and Region 5. However, due to limited number of copies, they quickly went out of stock. Each DVD contains 3 episodes encoded in MPEG-2 at a high bit rate of 8000 kbit/s and 720x576 resolution. Episodes 08, 10, 11, 22, 23, 24, 36, 55 and 61 are missing from the released set. All episodes starting from episode 70 to 100 (Seasons 2, 3 and 4) and earlier 10 random episodes from Season 1 of DuckTales are yet to be released in Hindi on DVD.

Europe (PAL)
In Europe, DuckTales has been released on DVD Collections. The packaging is adjusted regionally (artwork, language, age certification stamps), but all sets appear to contain identical content.

Note: Episodes 26-32 are missing from the European PAL DVDs (The Curse of Castle McDuck, Launchpad's Civil War, Sweet Duck of Youth, Earth Quack, Home Sweet Homer, Bermuda Triangle Tangle, Micro Ducks from Outer Space).  In the US NTSC release these were included in the first collection (27 episodes).

See also 
 Darkwing Duck
 Quack Pack

References

External links 
 
 

Episodes
Lists of Disney Channel television series episodes
Lists of American children's animated television series episodes